The 2001 Belgian Cup Final, took place on 27 May 2001 between Westerlo and second division champions Lommel. It was the 46th Belgian Cup final and was won by Westerlo. This was the first time since Tongeren in 1974 that a team from outside the top division had made it into the final.

Route to the final

Match

Details

External links
  

Belgian Cup finals
Cup Final